This page details the bird species described as new to science in the years 2000 to 2010:

Summary statistics

Number of species described per year

Countries with high numbers of newly described species
 Brazil
 Colombia
 Peru
 Indonesia

The birds, year-by-year

2000
 Foothill elaenia, Myiopagis olallai
Coopmans, P. & Krabbe, N. (2000) A new species of flycatcher (Tyrannidae: Myiopagis) from eastern Ecuador and eastern Peru Wilson Bulletin 112: 305–312

 Caatinga antwren, Herpsilochmus sellowi
Whitney, B.M.; Pacheco, J.F.; Buzzetti, D.R.C. & Parrini, R. (2000) Systematic revision and biogeography of the Herpsilochmus pileatus complex, with description of a new species from northeastern Brazil Auk 117: 869–891

 Taiwan bush-warbler, Bradypterus alishanensis
Rasmussen, P.C.; Round, P.D.; Dickinson, E.C. & Rozendaal, F.G. (2000) A new bush-warbler (Sylviidae, Bradypterus) from Taiwan The Auk 117: 279–289

 Scarlet-banded barbet or Wallace's scarlet-banded barbet, Capito wallacei
O'Neill, Lane, Kratter, Capparella & Fox Joo, 2000.

 Gunnison sage-grouse, Centrocercus minimus
Young, Braun, Oyler-McCance, Hupp & Quinn, 2000.

Newly split species:
 Gray-crested cacholote, Pseudoseisura unirufa, formerly included in the Caatinga cacholote
Zimmer, Kevin J. & Whittaker, Andrew (2000): The Rufous Cacholote (Furnariidae: Pseudoseisura) is two species. Condor 102(2): 409–422. PDF fulltext

2001
 Bukidnon woodcock, Scolopax bukidnonensis, from Mindanao and Luzon, Philippines.
Kennedy, Robert S.; Fisher, Timothy H.; Harrap, Simon C.B.; Diesmos, Arvin C: & Manamtam, Arturo S. (2001): A new species of woodcock from the Philippines and a re-evaluation of other Asian/Papuasian woodcock Forktail 17(1): 1–12. PDF fulltext

 Mekong wagtail, Motacilla samveasnae.
Duckworth, J.W.; Alström, P.; Davidson, P.; Evans, T.D.; Poole, C.M.; Tan, S. & Timmins, R.J. (2001) A new species of wagtail from the lower Mekong basin Bulletin of the British Ornithologists' Club 121: 152–182

 Chestnut-eared laughingthrush, Garrulax konkakinhensis.
 Eames, JC & Eames, C, 2001.

 Chestnut-capped piha, Lipaugus weberi.
 Cuervo, Andres, Salaman, P., Donegan, T.M. & Ochoa, J.M. 2001. A new species of piha (Cotingidae: Lipaugus) from the Cordillera Central of Colombia. Ibis 143: 353–368.

 Chapada flycatcher, Suiriri islerorum, from the cerrado region of Brazil and adjacent eastern Bolivia.
Zimmer, K.J.; Whittaker, A. & Oren, D.C. (2001): A cryptic new species of flycatcher (Tyrannidae: Suiriri) from the cerrado region of central South America Auk 118: 56–78

 Mishana tyrannulet, Zimmerius villarejoi, from Amazonian 'white sand forests' in northern Peru.
Alonso, J.A. & Whitney, B.M. (2001) A new Zimmerius tyrannulet (Aves: Tyrannidae) from white sand forests of northern Amazonian Peru Wilson Bulletin 113: 1–9

 Lulu's tody-tyrant. Poecilotriccus luluae, from the north-eastern Andes in Peru.
Johnson, N.K. & Jones, R.E. (2001) A new species of tody-tyrant (Tyrannidae: Poecilotriccus) from northern Peru Auk 118: 334–341.

2002
 Bald parrot, Pionopsitta aurantiocephala, from Brazil.
Gaban-Lima, Renato; Raposo, Marcos A. & Höfling, Elizabeth (2002): Description of a New Species of Pionopsitta (Aves: Psittacidae) Endemic to Brazil. Auk 119(3): 815–819. DOI:10.1642/0004-8038(2002)119[0815:DOANSO]2.0.CO;2 PDF fulltext

 Cryptic forest falcon, Micrastur mintoni, from Brazil.  Whittaker 2003 WilsonBull.(2002) 114 p. 421,422, front. Note:  This falcon was first reported in 2002; the name was not issued until the following year.
Kimberley pipit Anthus pseudosimilis, Liversidge & Voelker 2002 BBOC 122 p. 93 (Motacillidae)
 Little Sumba boobook, Ninox sumbaensis, from Indonesia.
Olsen, Jerry; Wink, Michael; Sauer-Gürth, Hedi & Trost, Susan (2002): A new Ninox owl from Sumba, Indonesia. Emu 102: 223–231.  PDF fulltext

 Madeira parakeet, Pyrrhura snethlageae, from the drainage of the Rio Madeira in Bolivia and Brazil, the scientific name of which honours Emilia Snethlage, who first recognized the distinctiveness of this form in 1914. It and the following are both part of the Pyrrhura picta complex.
 Wavy-breasted parakeet, Pyrrhura peruviana, from northern Peru (later also confirmed for far south-eastern Ecuador).

Carajas woodcreeper, Xiphocolaptes carajaensis.  Bulletin of the British Ornithologists' Club.

Newly split species
 Lafresnaye's woodcreeper,  Xiphorhynchus guttatoides, formerly included in the buff-throated woodcreeper.
 Elegant woodcreeper, X. elegans, formerly included in Spix's woodcreeper.
 Tschudi's woodcreeper, X. chunchotambo, formerly included in the ocellated woodcreeper.
Reference for the Xiphorhynchus splits: Aleixo, Alexandre (2002): Molecular Systematics and the Role of the "Várzea"-"Terra-Firme" Ecotone in the Diversification of Xiphorhynchus Woodcreepers (Aves: Dendrocolaptidae). Auk 119(3): 621–640. DOI: 10.1642/0004-8038(2002)119[0621:MSATRO]2.0.CO;2 HTML abstract

2003
(see above) Micrastur mintoni, first described in 2003.

 The Pernambuco pygmy owl Glaucidium mooreorum a Critically endangered species of Pygmy owl
 The Carrizal seedeater, Amaurospiza carrizalensis, from Venezuela.
 The Munchique wood-wren, Henicorhina negreti, is a member of the wren family (Troglodytidae). The bird is found on the Munchique Massif in the western Andes in the Chocó Endemic Bird Area, Colombia. The species' scientific name honours Alvaro José Negret, a Colombian conservationist. This is the first species to have been described as new to science on a website rather than in a traditional print-only journal (http://www.ornitologiacolombiana.org).
Reference: Salaman, Paul, Paul Coopmans, Thomas M. Donegan, Mark Mulligan, Alex Cortés, Steven L. Hilty and Luis Alfonso Ortega (2003) A new species of wood-wren (Troglodytidae: Henicorhina) from the western Andes of Colombia Ornitologia Colombiana Vol. 1 pp.4–21

 The Okarito brown kiwi, Apteryx rowi, (also known as the Rowi) is a member of the kiwi family (Apterygidae). The species is part of the brown kiwi complex, and is morphologically very similar to other members of that complex. It is found in a restricted area of the Okarito forest on the west coast of New Zealand's South Island, and has a population of only 200 birds.
Reference: Tennyson, A. J. D., R. L. Palma, H. A. Robertson, T. H. Worthy and B. J. Gill (2003) A new species of kiwi (Aves, Apterygiformes) from Okarito, New Zealand Records of the Auckland Museum Vol. 40 pp.55–64 

Xenoperdix udzungwensis obscurata Fjeldsa & Kiure 2003 BBOC 123 p. 53.  This was originally described as a subspecies.  Its status as a species separate from X. udzungwensis was recognized 2005:  Journal of East African Natural History
Article: pp. 191–201, "GENETIC AND MORPHOLOGICAL EVIDENCE FOR TWO SPECIES IN THE UDZUNGWA FOREST PARTRIDGE XENOPERDIX UDZUNGWENSIS". Rauri C.K. Bowiea, Jon Fjeldsa.

2004
 The Serendib scops-owl, Otus thilohoffmanni, is a small, rufous owl (Strigidae) found in lowland rainforests in Sri Lanka. The new species was discovered in February 1995, when Deepal Warakagoda heard unfamiliar owl-like vocalisations, although it was not until January 2001, when Warakagoda saw the bird, that his suspicions were confirmed; other observers had suggested that an arboreal amphibian may have been the source of the noises. The name "Serendib" is an old name for Sri Lanka; the species' scientific name, however, honours conservationist Thilo W. Hoffmann.
Warakagoda, D.H. & Rasmussen, P.C. (2004) A new species of scops-owl from Sri Lanka Bulletin of the British Ornithologists' Club Vol. 124 pp. 85–105

 The Togian hawk-owl, Ninox burhani, is an owl (Strigidae). The bird is known only from three islands in the Togian group, an archipelago in the Gulf of Tomini off the coast of Sulawesi, Indonesia. The new species was discovered on 25 December 1999. The species' scientific name honours a local conservationist called Burhan.
Indrawan, M. & Somadikarta, S. (2004) A new hawk-owl from the Togian Islands, Gulf of Tomini, central Sulawesi, Indonesia Bulletin of the British Ornithologists' Club 124:160–171

 The Rubeho akalat, Sheppardia aurantiithorax, is a member of the Old World flycatcher family (Muscicapiidae), known from the Eastern Arc of Tanzania. Akalats trapped in 1989 here were assumed to be an isolated population of Iringa akalat which occurs c. 150 km to the south, but further specimens collected in 2000 led to the description of the bird as a new species. The bird's English name relates to its type locality; the scientific name to the ochraceous colour on its throat and upper breast. The species is thought to be fairly common in montane forests within its small range.
Beresford, P.; Fjeldså, J. & Kiure, J. (2004) A new species of akalat (Sheppardia narrowly endemic in the Eastern Arc of Tanzania) Auk 121:23–24

 Acre antshrike, Thamnophilus divisorus, from Brazil
Whitney, Bret M.; Oren, David C. & Brumfield, Robb T. (2004): A new species of Thamnophilus Antshrike (Aves: Thamnophilidae) from the Serra do Divisor, Acre, Brazil. Auk 121(4): 1031–1039. DOI:10.1642/0004-8038(2004)121[1031:ANSOTA]2.0.CO;2 HTML fulltext without images

 The Calayan rail, Gallirallus calayanensis, is a member of the rail family (Rallidae) found only on Calayan Island, one of the Babuyan Islands in the Philippines. It was discovered in 2004 as part of a faunal survey of the Babuyan islands. It is found in limestone forests on the island.
Allen, Desmond; Oliveros, Carl; Espaňola, Carmela; Broad, Genevieve & Gonzalez, Juan Carlos T. (2004) A new species of Gallirallus from Calayan island, Philippines Forktail Vol. 20 pp. 1–7

 Mees's nightjar, Caprimulgus meesi, is a member of the nightjar family (Caprimulgidae). It is a representative of the large-tailed nightjar complex found on Flores and Sumba, Indonesia. Previously unrecognised as a separate taxon due to its lack of morphological distinctness, Sangster and Rozendaal (2004) described this new species on the basis of its vocalisations, which differ significantly from those of the large-tailed nightjar races resident on other islands in the Lesser Sundas. The species is named after Gerlof Mees, former curator of the Natural History Museum, Leiden.
Sangster, G. & Rozendaal, F. (2004) Territorial songs and species-level taxonomy of nightjars of the Caprimulgus macrurus complex, with the description of a new species. Zoologische Verhandelingen (Leiden) Vol. 350 pp. 7–45 PDF

2005
 The sulphur-breasted parakeet, Aratinga pintoi, (a member of the parrot family, Psittacidae) is found along the northern bank of the lower River Amazon in Pára state, Brazil. The species' scientific name honours Oliverio Pinto, a Brazilian ornithologist. This species was discovered as a result of a study of museum specimens of sun parakeet and related species; specimens of this species had been dismissed as immature parakeets of other species, or hybrids.
Silviera, L.; de Lima, F.C.T. & Höfling, E. (2005) A new species of Aratinga parakeet (Psittaciformes:Psittacidae) from Brazil, with taxonomic remarks on the Aratinga solstitialis complex Auk 122:292–305

 The Upper Magdalena tapaculo, Scytalopus rodriguezi, (a member of the tapaculo family, Rhinocryptidae) is a restricted-range endemic presently known only from two localities on the eastern slope of the Cordillera Central at the head of the Magdalena valley, Colombia at 2000m or more above sea-level. Its range is believed to be no greater than 170 km2, and its population around 2,200 pairs. It is found in humid forest with dense understorey. The species' scientific name honours José Vicente Rodriguez Mahecha, a Colombian conservationist. The existence of this species was first suspected in 1986, when a tape-recording of the bird's song was made, but political instability in the region prevented a return visit until 2002–2003, when the species' existence was confirmed.
Krabbe, N.; Salaman, P.; Cortés, A.; Quevedo, A.; Ortega, L.A. & Cadena, C.D. (2005) A new species of tapaculo from the upper Magdalena valley, Colombia Bulletin of the British Ornithologists' Club 125:93–108

 Stiles's tapaculo, Scytalopus stilesi, is the second member of the tapaculo family, Rhinocryptidae, to be newly described in 2005. It has been found at 21 sites in montane forest between 1,420 and 2,130 m altitude in the northern Cordillera Central of the Colombian Andes; although having a restricted range, within this limited area it is a common understorey bird. The species was originally observed in the 1990s, but when Niels Krabbe examined recordings of their songs, his suspicions arose that they were a new species – Stiles's tapaculo's song is considerably faster and lower-pitched than that of the closely related Ecuadorian tapaculo S. robbinsi. The species is named in honour of F. Gary Stiles, an ornithologist heavily involved in research on Neotropical birds during the 1980s & 1990s.
Cuervo, Andrés M.; Cadena, Carlos Daniel; Krabbe, Niels & Renjifo, Luis Miguel (2005): Scytalopus stilesi, a new species of tapaculo (Rhinocryptidae) from the Cordillera Central of Colombia. Auk 122(2): 445–463. [English with Spanish abstract] DOI:10.1642/0004-8038(2005)122[0445:SSANSO]2.0.CO;2 PDF fulltext

 The Iquitos gnatcatcher, Polioptila clementsi, is a gnatcatcher (Polioptilidae) only known from the Allpahuayo-Mishana National Reserve, west of Iquitos, Peru. The species is a member of the Polioptila guianensis complex. It is named after James F. Clements.
Whitney, Bret M. & Alonso, José Alvarez (2005) A new species of Gnatcatcher from white-sand forests of northern Amazonian Peru, with revision of the Polioptila guianensis complex The Wilson Bulletin Vol. 117 No. 2 pp. 113–127

 Naung Mung scimitar-babbler, Jabouilleia naungmungensis, from Myanmar
Rappole, John H.; Renner, Swen C.; Shwe, Nay Myo & Sweet, Paul R. (2005): A new species of scimitar-babbler (Timaliidae: Jabouilleia) from the sub-Himalayan region of Myanmar Auk 122(4): 1064–1069. [English with Spanish abstract] DOI:[10.1642/0004-8038(2005)122[1064:ANSOST]2.0.CO;2 HTML abstract

 Planalto tapaculo, Scytalopus pachecoi, formerly included in the mouse-colored tapaculo.
Mauricio, Giovanni Nachtigall (2005): Taxonomy of southern populations in the Scytalopus speluncae group, with description of a new species and remarks on the systematics and biogeography of the complex (Passeriformes: Rhinocryptidae). Ararajuba 13(1): 7–28. PDF fulltext

2006
 The odedi, Cettia haddeni, is a species in the Old World warbler family, described from the Crown Prince Range on the island of Bougainville in the Solomon Islands, Papua New Guinea.
Reference LeCroy, M. & F.K. Barker (2006) A new species of bush-warbler from Bougainville Island and a monophyletic origin for southwest Pacific Cettia. American Museum Novitates no. 3511 Amer. Mus. Novit.

 The Camiguin hanging-parrot,  Loriculus camiguinensis Reuters   
 Hocking's conure, Aratinga hockingi,
 Arndt, T. (2006) 

Bugun liocichla Liocichla bugunorum
 an Old World babbler from India.
Athreya, R. (2006) "A new species of Liocichla (Aves: Timaliidae) from Eaglenest Wildlife Sanctuary, Arunachal Pradesh, India" Indian Birds 2(4): 82–94 

 Scytalopus notorius Raposo, MA, Stopiglia, Loskot & Kirwan 2006 Zootaxa 1271 p. 44. A new name for the relatively well known mouse-coloured tapaculo, as the typically used name, Scytalopus speluncae, apparently belong to another species which had been considered undescribed.

See also
 Yariguies brush finch (Described as a new subspecies)
Atlapetes latinuchus yariguierum Donegan, TM & Huertas 2006 BBOC 126 p. 98

2007
 Sincorá antwren, Formicivora grantsaui (Thamnophilidae) Gonzaga, Carvalhaes & Buzzetti 2007 Zootaxa 1473 p. 25,28
 Gorgeted puffleg, Eriocnemis isabellae hummingbird, Trochilidae Cortes, A, Ortega, LA, Mazariegos-Hurtado & Weller 2007 Orn.Neotrop. 18 no.2 p. 161,162.  The validity of this species was questioned briefly (see www.worldtwitch.com), but only until the strikingly plumaged female became known.
 Rufous twistwing, Cnipodectes superrufus: Lane, D., G. P. Servat, T. Valqui H., & F. R. Lambert. 2007. A distinctive new species of Tyrant flycatcher (Passerifomer: Tyrannidae: Cnipodectes) from south-eastern Peru. Auk. 124(3): 762–772.
 Antioquia brush-finch, Atlapetes blancae: Donegan, T.M. 2007. A new species of brush finch (Emberizidae: Atlapetes) from the northern Central Andes of Colombia . Bulletin of the British Ornithologists' Club. 127(4): 255–268
 Diamantina tapaculo, Scytalopus diamantinensis: Bornschein, M. R., G. N. Maurício, R. Belmonte-Lopes, H. Mata & S. L. Bonatto. 2007. Diamantina tapaculo, a new Scytalopus endemic to the Chapada Diamantina, northeastern Brazil (Passeriformes: Rhinocryptidae). Revista Brasileira de Ornitologia 15(2):151–174.
 Grey-crowned tyrannulet, Serpophaga griseicapilla: Straneck, R. 2007. Una nueva especie de Serpophaga (Aves Tyrannidae). Revista FAVE – Ciencias Veterinarias 6 (1–2): 31–42.

Newly split species
 Solomon Islands frogmouth, Rigidipenna inexpectata – split from marbled frogmouth
Reference Cleere et al., (2007) A new genus of frogmouth (Podargidae) from the Solomon Islands – results from a taxonomic review of Podargus ocellatus inexpectatus Hartert 1901 Ibis 149 (2), 271–286.

2008
 Nonggang babbler, Stachyris nonggangensis: Zhou Fang & Jiang Aiwu (2008). A new species of babbler (Timaliidae: Stachyris) from the Sino-Vietnamese border region of China. Auk 125(2): 420–424.
 Yungas tyrannulet, Phyllomyias weedeni: Herzog, Kessler & Balderrama. (2008). A new species of tyrannulet (Tyrannidae: Phyllomyias) from Andean foothills in northwest Bolivia and adjacent Peru. Auk 125(2): 265–276.
 Olive-backed forest robin, Stiphrornis pyrrholaemus: Schmidt, Foster, Angehr, Durrant & Fleischer (2008). A new species of African Forest Robin from Gabon (Passeriformes: Muscicapidae: Stiphrornis). Zootaxa 1850: 27–42 
 Monteiro's storm-petrel, Oceanodroma monteiroi: Monteiro's Storm-petrel Oceanodroma monteiroi: a new species from the Azoresby: MARK Bolton, Andrea L Smith, Elena Gomez-Diaz, Vicki L Friesen, Renata Medeiros, JOEL Bried, Jose L Roscales, Robert W Furness Ibis, Vol. 150, No. 4. (October 2008), pp. 717–727
 Vanikoro white-eye, Zosterops gibbsi: A new species of White-eye Zosterops and notes on other birds from Vanikoro, Solomon Islands by: GUY Dutson Ibis, Vol. 150, No. 4. (October 2008), pp. 698–706.
 Togian white-eye, Zosterops somadikartai: Mochamad Indrawan, Pamela C. Rasmussen, and Sunarto (2008) "A New White-Eye (Zosterops) from the Togian Islands, Sulawesi, Indonesia" The Wilson Journal of Ornithology 120(1): 1–9
 Amazon red-fronted parakeet, Pyrrhura parvifrons: Arndt, T. (2008). Anmerkungen zu einigen Pyrrhura-Formen mit der Beschreibung einer neuen Art und zweier neuer Unterarten. Papageien 8/2008.

2009
 Bare-faced bulbul, Pycnonotus hualon: Woxvold, I. A., J. W. Duckworth, & R. J. Timmins (2009). An unusual new bulbul (Passeriformes: Pycnonotidae) from the limestone karst of Lao PDR. Forktail 25: 1–12.
 Rubeho warbler, Sceptomycter rubehoensis: Bowie, R.C.K., J. Fjeldså, & J. Kiure (2009). Multilocus molecular DNA variation in Winifred's Warbler Scepomycter winifredae suggests cryptic speciation and the existence of a threatened species in the Rubeho–Ukaguru Mountains of Tanzania. Ibis 151(4): 709–719.
 South Hills crossbill, Loxia sinesciurus: 
 Río Orinoco spinetail, Synallaxis beverlyae: 
 Black-capped woodnymph, Thalurania nigricapilla:

Described in this period, no longer considered valid species

Vanuatu petrel or Falla's Petrel, Pterodroma occulta.
 Imber & Tennyson, 2001.

 Beijing flycatcher Ficedula beijingnica, now considered to be the first-year male of the Chinese flycatcher Ficedula elisae
Reference: Zheng, G, Song, J, Zhang, Z, Zhang, Y, & Guo, D (2000) A new species of flycatcher (Ficedula) from China (Aves: Passeriformes: Muscicapidae) Journ Beijing Normal Univ (Nat Sci) 36: 405–409

References

'
Birds
Lists of birds